The 1982 Egyptian Open was a men's tennis tournament played on outdoor clay courts that was part of the 1982 Volvo Grand Prix circuit. It was the sixth edition of the tournament and was played in Cairo,  Egypt from 22 February until 28 February 1982. Useeded Brad Drewett won the singles title.

Finals

Singles
 Brad Drewett defeated  Claudio Panatta 6–3, 6–3
 It was Drewett's first singles title of his career.

Doubles
 Jim Gurfein /  Drew Gitlin defeated  Heinz Günthardt /  Markus Günthardt 6–4, 7–5

References

External links
 ITF tournament edition details

Cairo Open
Cairo Open
1982 in Egypt